Milan Hill State Park is a  public recreation area located on New Hampshire Route 110B in the town of Milan, New Hampshire. The state park features a 1932 fire tower and camping.

The park is 1 of 10 New Hampshire state parks that are in the path of totality for the 2024 solar eclipse, with 26 seconds of totality.

History
The park began as a Civilian Conservation Corps camp in the 1930s. The original name of Milan Hill was Barrows Mountain, first settled around 1822 by John Ellingwood and his wife Rachel Barrows. Their son Isaac was the first white child born on Milan Hill.

References

External links 
Milan Hill State Park New Hampshire Department of Natural and Cultural Resources

State parks of New Hampshire
Parks in Coös County, New Hampshire
Protected areas established in 1939
1939 establishments in New Hampshire
Civilian Conservation Corps in New Hampshire